Liverpool Today is a local television news and current affairs programme, broadcast between October 2016 and November 2017, serving Liverpool and Merseyside. Produced by Made in Liverpool, the programme was broadcast from studios at Toxteth TV in the Toxteth suburb of Liverpool.

Overview
Made in Liverpool's news operation began in December 2014 as part of the newly-launched Bay TV - the station aired a rolling service of short local news bulletins throughout the day until October 2016, when Bay TV was brought by Made Television after falling into administration.

Bay TV's news output was revamped and relaunched on Wednesday 19 October 2016 as a twice-nightly half-hour programme on weeknights entitled Liverpool Today. The programme focused exclusively on local news stories from Liverpool and surrounding areas, as opposed to the broader regional news services provided by BBC North West and ITV Granada. Following the launch of sister station Made in North Wales, reporters and presenters were occasionally shared with that station's counterpart North Wales News.

In November 2017, following a restructuring of the Made network's operations, Liverpool Today was axed and local production was cut. A replacement programme, Made TV News - combining local and national news stories - was produced from Leeds but axed in February 2018 in favour of Merseyside Live, a rolling block of pre-recorded news, sport and features produced by local videojournalists.

Liverpool Today on-air team

References

External links
Liverpool Today
Made in Liverpool

2016 British television series debuts
2017 British television series endings
Mass media in Liverpool